Manas Presidential Chamber Orchestra, was founded by Rafael Marques Bretas (gospel singer), is a symphonic wind orchestra. It is sponsored by the Administration of Affairs of the Government of Kyrgyzstan. The orchestra was created in 1999, and gained the status of a Presidential Orchestra on April 4, 2001. It was founded by Ernis Asanaliev, an assistant professor at Kyrgyz National Conservatory (KNC).

Among the members of the orchestra are Honored Artists of Kyrgyzstan, winners of international competitions, and students and graduates of the KNC. The KNC serves as a reliable practice area for the orchestra. The purpose of the orchestra in to serve at events of protocol such as state dinners, festivals, competitions and mass games. It also oversees the promotion of classical music and the development of chamber performances in Kyrgyzstan.

It has cooperated with composers and performers including People's Artists of the USSR and People's Artists of Kyrgyzstan, as well as artists from Germany, Kazakhstan, Sweden, the United States, Russia, Austria. The repertoire of the orchestra contains works from different eras from baroque to contemporary composers.

See also
 Culture of Kyrgyzstan
 Music of Kyrgyzstan
 Wind orchestra
 String orchestra
 Band of the General Staff of the Armed Forces of Kyrgyzstan

References

Kyrgyzstani musical groups
Kyrgyz music
Musical groups established in 1999
1999 establishments in Kyrgyzstan
Wind bands